The Birim River or Ok Birim in the western province of New Guinea is a tributary of the Ok Tedi River, which is in turn a tributary of the north Fly River. The Birim river joins the Ok Tedi river from the west between Ningerum and Bige. The Birim river area is inhabited by the Yonggom tribe. They practise tropical forest Swidden agriculture. About 3,000 people, they speak the Ninggerum language of the Ok group.

There has been ongoing controversy about impacts on migratory fish stocks and on the environment in general from dredging and other  mining operations by the Ok Tedi Mining Limited at what remains of Mount Fubilan. Since 1984, the people of the area have blamed the mine for general declines in crops and fish yields.

References

Rivers of Papua New Guinea
Western Province (Papua New Guinea)
Fly River